The Arsen'yev Rocks are rock outcrops lying among the morainal deposits  west of Mount Deryugin in the Liebknecht Range of the Humboldt Mountains, in Queen Maud Land. They were mapped from air photos and from surveys by the Soviet Antarctic Expedition, 1960–61, and were named after the Russian geographer Konstantin Ivanovich Arsen'yev.

References 

Rock formations of Queen Maud Land
Humboldt Mountains (Antarctica)